Phallus flavocostatus is an East Asian species of fungus in the stinkhorn family. First described as Ithyphallus costatus by Otto Albert Julius Penzig in 1899, it was transferred to the genus Phallus by Curtis Gates Lloyd in 1909. It was given a new name by Hanns Kreisel in 1996.

References

External links

Fungi described in 1899
Phallales